Jordan Addison (born January 27, 2002) is a college football wide receiver for the USC Trojans. He previously played for the Pittsburgh Panthers, where he won the 2021 Fred Biletnikoff Award before transferring to USC in 2022.

High school career
Addison attended Tuscarora High School in Frederick, Maryland. He played wide receiver, quarterback and defensive back in high school. He committed to the University of Pittsburgh to play college football.

College career
Addison played in 10 games and started eight as a true freshman at Pittsburgh in 2020. He led the team with 60 receptions for 666 yards and four touchdowns. He returned to Pittsburgh as a starter in 2021. In 2021, he went on to lead college football in touchdown receptions with 17 in the 2021 regular season while catching 100 passes for 1,593 yards. He earned consensus All-American honors and won the 2021 Fred Biletnikoff Award.

In May 2022, Addison announced that he would be transferring to the University of Southern California to play for the USC Trojans football team. He chose to wear #3 for the Trojans, which was previously retired in honor of Carson Palmer, the 2002 Heisman Trophy winner.

References

External links
USC Trojans bio
Pittsburgh Panthers bio

2002 births
Living people
Sportspeople from Frederick, Maryland
Players of American football from Maryland
American football wide receivers
Pittsburgh Panthers football players
USC Trojans football players
All-American college football players